Urdo may refer to:
 Urdo, a character from The King's Peace novel

See also 
 Urdos, a commune of France
 Urdu, an Indo-Aryan language
 Ordu (disambiguation)
 Ordo (disambiguation)